The 2014 Erie Explosion season is the eighth season for the Continental Indoor Football League (CIFL) franchise.

In June 2013, the Explosion agreed to terms with the CIFL to return for the 2014 season.

The Explosion earned an 8–2 record during the 2014 regular season and won their second consecutive CIFL championship. It would be the league's last championship; the CIFL dissolved after the 2014 season. The Explosion will continue.

Roster

Schedule

Regular season

Note that the April 27 contest was originally against the Detroit Thunder, but the team ceased operations prior to the end of the season and the ASI Panthers, an independent farm club to the Arena Football League's Philadelphia Soul, were used as a replacement team. The April 13 contest was actually played against the Erie Express, a local semi-professional squad, because of a mass resignation in the Port Huron Patriots organization (the Express players played in Patriots uniforms).

Standings

Postseason

Coaching staff

References

Erie Explosion seasons
2014 Continental Indoor Football League season
Erie Explosin